War Against Rape (WAR) is a non-governmental organization (NGO) based in Karachi and founded in 1989.

Through 1979–1988 martial law was enacted in Pakistan; this led to the creation of many NGOs, including WAR. The group's mission is to publicize the problem of rape in Pakistan; in a report released in 1992 covering 60 reported case of rape, 20% involved police officers. In 2008 the group claimed that several of its members were assaulted by a religious group as they tried to help a woman who had been gang raped identify her assailants.

See also
 Recognition of marital rape in Pakistani law

References

External links
 

Political organisations based in Pakistan
Rape in Pakistan
1989 establishments in Pakistan